The 1940 United States presidential election in North Carolina took place on November 5, 1940, as part of the 1940 United States presidential election. North Carolina voters chose 13 representatives, or electors, to the Electoral College, who voted for president and vice president.

Background and vote
As a former Confederate state, North Carolina had a history of Jim Crow laws, disfranchisement of its African-American population and dominance of the Democratic Party in state politics. However, unlike the Deep South, the Republican Party had sufficient historic Unionist white support from the mountains and northwestern Piedmont to gain one-third of the statewide vote total in most general elections, where turnout was higher than elsewhere in the former Confederacy due substantially to the state’s early abolition of the poll tax in 1920. Like Virginia, Tennessee and Oklahoma, the relative strength of Republican opposition meant that North Carolina did not have statewide white primaries, although certain counties did use the white primary.

In 1928, anti-Catholicism in the Outer Banks and growing middle-class urban Republicanism in Piedmont cities turned North Carolina to GOP nominee Herbert Hoover, but this was sharply and severely reversed in the following two elections as exceptionally heavy support was given to Democratic nominee Franklin D. Roosevelt in all but a few rock-ribbed Republican mountain bastions. In 1940, large portions of the interior of the United States – heavily populated by German Americans – opposed increasing "tension" with Nazi dictator Adolf Hitler and turned to Republican candidate Wendell Willkie. North Carolina, however, was historically one of the least isolationist states, and its almost entirely English and Scotch-Irish descended electorate strongly favoured as much aid to Britain’s World War II effort as possible. Thus, North Carolina’s electorate did not merely resist the GOP shift in the heartland – in many Appalachian counties with normally substantial Republican support, FDR gained on what he had achieved in his 1932 and 1936 national landslides.

North Carolina was thus won in a landslide by incumbent President Franklin D. Roosevelt (D–New York), running with Secretary Henry A. Wallace, with 74.03 percent of the popular vote, against Wendell Willkie (R–Indiana), running with Minority Leader Charles L. McNary, with 25.97 percent of the popular vote.

, this is the last election in which Davie County and Randolph County voted for a Democratic presidential candidate. This is also the best Democratic performance in the state since Andrew Jackson in 1832.

Results

Results by county

References

North Carolina
1940
1940 North Carolina elections